Valea Izvorului River may refer to:
 Valea Izvorului, a tributary of the Lotru in Vâlcea County, Romania
 Valea Izvorului, a tributary of the Valea Ploscarilor in Sibiu County, Romania